Jimmy Jimmy was an English short-lived pop band from Coventry, England, during the mid-1980s. They released one LP entitled Here in the Light in 1986 on CBS Records and a few singles including "I Met Her in Paris" and "Silence", which was a number 1 hit in Japan. The band members were James O'Neill and Jimmy Kemp.

The duo are still active today.

Discography

Albums
Here in the Light (1986), Epic/CBS

Singles
"Love" (1985), Epic
"I Met Her in Paris" (1985), Epic
"Silence" (1985), Epic

References

External links

English pop music duos
English new wave musical groups
Musical groups from Coventry
New wave duos
Epic Records artists